Basie in Sweden (subtitled Recorded Live in Concert featuring Louis Bellson on Drums) is a live album by pianist, composer and bandleader Count Basie featuring tracks recorded at an amusement park in Sweden in 1962 and originally released on the Roulette label.

Reception

AllMusic awarded the album 4½ stars.

Track listing
 "Little Pony" (Neal Hefti) – 2:25
 "Plymouth Rock" (Hefti) – 7:00
 "Backwater Blues" (Bessie Smith) – 5:06
 "Who Me" (Frank Foster) – 3:23
 "April in Paris" (Vernon Duke, Yip Harburg) – 3:30
 "Backstage Blues" (Don Elliott, Terry Gibbs, Urbie Green) – 5:00
 "Good Time Blues" (Ernie Wilkins) – 5:00
 "Peace Pipe" (Wilkins) – 4:35
Recorded at the Dans in at Gröna Lund in Stockholm, Sweden on August 10 (track 5), August 11 (tracks 1, 2, 4, 6 & 7) & August 12 (tracks 3 & 8), 1962

Personnel 
Count Basie – piano
Benny Bailey (tracks 1, 4 & 6), Al Aarons, Sonny Cohn, Thad Jones, Fip Ricard – trumpet
Henry Coker, Quentin Jackson, Åke Persson (tracks 1, 4 & 6), Benny Powell – trombone
Marshal Royal, Frank Wess – alto saxophone
Eric Dixon, Frank Foster – tenor saxophone
Charlie Fowlkes – baritone saxophone
Freddie Green – guitar
Ike Isaacs – bass
Louis Bellson – drums
Irene Reid – vocals (track 3)

References 

1962 live albums
Count Basie Orchestra live albums
Roulette Records live albums
Albums produced by Teddy Reig